Stephan Paternot is an IT entrepreneur, known as a co-founder of theGlobe.com, the internet's first social network, during the late nineties dot-com bubble. He is currently the CEO of Slated, an online crowdsourcing marketplace for film financing, sales, packaging and development.

Biography
In 1994, while a junior at Cornell University, Paternot co-founded the first Internet social network site, theglobe.com. The company's IPO made history when it posted the largest first day gain of any IPO with a 606% increase in price. Early in his tenure, Paternot became known in popular media as "the CEO in the plastic pants" after he was filmed in a nightclub saying "Got the girl. Got the money. Now I'm ready to live a disgusting, frivolous life." theGlobe.com's stock price collapsed in 1999 as a result of the dot-com bubble and in 2001 Paternot published A Very Public Offering: A Rebel's Story of Business Success, Excess, and Reckoning which covered his biography and the history of theGlobe.com

In 2011, Paternot co-founded Slated, a crowdfunding and development website for film projects.

References

External links
Stephan Paternot's homepage

American computer businesspeople
Living people
Year of birth missing (living people)